There are a variety of pronunciations in modern English and in historical forms of the language for words spelled with the letter . Most of these go back to the low vowel (the "short A") of earlier Middle English, which later developed both long and short forms. The sound of the long vowel was altered in the Great Vowel Shift, but later a new long A (or "broad A") developed which was not subject to the shift. Separate developments have produced additional pronunciations in words like wash, talk and comma.

Overview

The   ("short A") was found in words such as cat  and trap , and also before  in words such as start . The  ("long A") was found in words such as face , and before  in words such as scare . This long A was generally a result of Middle English open syllable lengthening. For a summary of the various developments in Old and Middle English that led to these vowels, see English historical vowel correspondences.

After 1700 it was raised even further, and then diphthongized, leading to the modern standard pronunciation . Today there is much regional variation in the realization of this vowel; in RP there has been a recent trend for it to be lowered again to a fully open .

However, this putative gap was filled by the following special developments:
 In two environments, Middle English  developed to  rather than 
 Before some fricatives, broadening happened inconsistently and sporadically

The following table shows some developments of Middle English  in Received Pronunciation.  The word gate, which derived from Middle English , has also been included for comparison.

The table below shows the results of these developments in some contemporary varieties of English:

* May undergo -tensing.

Old and Middle English

Old English (OE) had an open back vowel , written , as well as a front vowel , written .

In Middle English (ME), the short  became merged into a single vowel , written . In some cases (before certain pairs of consonants) the corresponding long vowels also developed into this short . For more details, see English historical vowel correspondences.

Later, with the gradual loss of unstressed endings, many such syllables ceased to be open, but the vowel remained long.

Further development of Middle English 

"seems to have been the normal pronunciation in careful speech before 1650, and  after 1650". After 1700 it was raised even further, and then diphthongized, leading to the modern standard pronunciation , found in words like name, face, bacon. However, some accents, in the north of England and in Scotland, for example, retain a monophthongal pronunciation of this vowel, while other accents have a variety of different diphthongs.

Changes in realization of 
This change was mostly confined to "vulgar or popular" speech in the 16th century, but it gradually replaced the more conservative  in the 17th century, and was "generally accepted by careful speakers by about 1670".

In present-day RP, however, it has lowered to a fully front . Such a quality is also found in the accents of northern England, Wales, Scotland, Ireland, and the Caribbean. Raised pronunciations are also found in Southern Hemisphere English, and are also associated with Cockney. For the possibility of phonemic length differentiation, see bad–lad split, below.

Development of the new long A
In Modern English, a new phoneme  developed that did not exist in Middle English. In most dialects that developed the broad A class, words containing it joined this new phoneme  as well. The new phoneme also became common in onomatopoeic words like baa, ah, ha ha, as well as in foreign borrowed words like spa, 
taco, 
llama, 
drama, 
piranha, 
Bahamas, 
pasta, 
Bach, 

Some of these developments are discussed in detail in the following sections.

Before /r/

However, by the late 17th century they were also distinguished by the quality and length of the vowel. This latter change seems to have first occurred in the dialects of southern England in the early 15th century, but did not affect Standard English until the later 17th century. It has affected most varieties of contemporary English, which have distinct vowels in pairs such as cat, cart.

Hence the first vowel of carrot and marry has normally remained the same as that of cat (but see the mary–marry–merry merger). However, inflected forms and derivatives of words ending in (historic)  generally inherit the lengthened vowel, so words like barring and starry have  as do bar and star.

Before fricatives
Unlike lengthening before nonprevocalic , which applied universally in Standard English, lengthening, or broadening, before fricatives was inconsistent and sporadic.  This seems to have first occurred in the dialects of Southern England between about 1500 and 1650.  It penetrated into Standard English from these dialects around the mid-17th century.

The primary environment which favored broadening was before preconsonantal or morpheme-final voiceless fricatives .  The voiceless fricative  has never promoted broadening in Standard English in words like ash and crash.  There is, however, evidence that such broadening did occur in dialects.

Once broadening affected a particular word, it tended to spread by analogy to its inflectional derivatives.  For example, from pass there was also passing .  This introduced broadening into the environment _sV, from which it was otherwise excluded (compare passage which is not an inflectional form, and was never affected by broadening).

In a phenomenon going back to Middle English,  alternate with their voiced equivalents . For example, late Middle English path  alternated with paths . This introduced broadening into the environment before a voiced fricative.

Broadening affected Standard English extremely inconsistently. It is apparent that it occurred most commonly in short words, especially monosyllables, that were common and well-established in English at the time broadening took place (c. 1500–1650). Words of 3 or more syllables were hardly ever subject to broadening. Learned words, neologisms (such as gas, first found in the late 17th century), and Latinate or Greek borrowings were rarely broadened.

A particularly interesting case is that of the word father.  In late Middle English this was generally pronounced , thus rhyming with gather .  Broadening of father is notable both in two respects:
 its occurrence before an intervocalic voiced fricative 
 its distribution in many accents that do not otherwise have broadening, such as those of North America.
The Oxford English Dictionary describes the broadening of father as "anomalous". Dobson, however, sees broadening in father as due to the influence of the adjacent  and  combined.  Rather and lather appear to have been subject to broadening later, and in fewer varieties of English, by analogy with father.

The table below represents the results of broadening before fricatives in contemporary Received Pronunciation.

 * indicates that the other pronunciation is also current in RP.
 ** indicates that this word had late Middle English  (possibly in addition to late Middle English )
 Words in italics were first recorded by the Oxford English Dictionary later than 1650

The exceptions are:
In accents of England the development was subsequently the same as that in words such as palm (see below).
 laugh, laughter and draft/draught, which all had  in Middle English. The development of draft/draught is notable: in the 17th century it was usually spelled draught and pronounced to rhyme with caught, making clear its derivation from the verb to draw.

The words castle, fasten and raspberry are special cases where subsequent sound changes have altered the conditions initially responsible for lengthening.

The pattern of lengthening shown here for Received Pronunciation is generally found in southern England, the Caribbean, and the Southern hemisphere (parts of Australia, New Zealand and South Africa).  In North America, with the possible exception of older Boston accents, broadening is found only in father (the success of broadening in this word alone in North America unexplained) and pasta (which follows the general pattern for recent Italian loanwords, cf. mafia).  In the Boston area there has historically been a tendency to copy RP lengthening which perhaps reached its zenith in the 1930s but has since receded in the face of general North American norms.

In Irish English broadening is found only in father (which may, however, also have the FACE vowel).  In Scottish and Ulster English the great majority of speakers have no distinction between TRAP and PALM (the Sam–psalm merger). In Welsh English Wells finds broadening generally only in father, with some variation. In the north of England, broadening is usually found only in father and half, and in some regions master.

Before nasals
There was a class of Middle English words in which  varied with  before a nasal.  These are nearly all loanwords from French, in which uncertainty about how to realize the nasalization of the French vowel resulted in two varying pronunciations in English. (One might compare the different ways in which modern French loanwords like envelope are pronounced in contemporary varieties of English.)

However, in some of the words with the  alternation, especially short words in common use, the vowel instead developed into a long A. In words like change and angel, this development preceded the Great Vowel Shift, and so the resulting long A followed the normal development to modern . In other cases, however, the long A appeared later, and thus did not undergo the Great Vowel Shift, but instead merged with the long A that had developed before  and some fricatives (as described above). Thus words like dance and example have come to be pronounced (in modern RP, although mostly not in General American) with the  vowel of start and bath.

* Not a French loanword

For example, from Sandre, a Norman French form of the name Alexander, the modern English surnames Sanders and Saunders are both derived.

split 

The  split is a vowel split that occurs mainly in the southern and mainstream varieties of English in England (including Received Pronunciation), in the Southern Hemisphere accents of English (Australian English, New Zealand English, South African English), and also to a lesser extent in older Boston English, by which the Early Modern English phoneme  was lengthened in certain environments and ultimately merged with the long  of father.

merger
The merger is likely not categorical, which means that the phonemes remain distinct in their underlying form, as they usually do in RP.

Thus, cockney may be an example of a language variety that contrasts near-front and fully front vowels of the same height, roundedness and length, though the former tends to undergo lengthening before  (see bad-lad split).

merger 

Bad–lad split
The bad–lad split has been described as a phonemic split of the Early Modern English short vowel phoneme  into a short  and a long . This split is found in Australian English and some varieties of English English in which bad (with long ) and lad (with short ) do not rhyme.

It is furthermore lengthened in the adjectives bad, glad and mad; family also sometimes has a long vowel, regardless of whether it is pronounced as two or three syllables. Lengthening is not stopped by the addition of word-level suffixes.

In this circumstance, Australian speakers usually (but not universally) use , except in the words aunt, can't and shan't, which have broad .

Thus, in An outline of English phonetics (1962, ninth edition, Cambridge: W. Heffer & Sons) he noted that sad, bad generally had  but lad, pad had . In his pronouncing dictionary, he recorded several minimal pairs, for example bad , bade  (also pronounced ). He noted that for some speakers, jam actually represented two different pronunciations, one pronounced   meaning 'fruit conserve', the other  meaning 'crush, wedging'. Later editions of this dictionary, edited by Alfred C. Gimson, dropped this distinction.

A common minimal pair for modern RP speakers is band  and banned . Other minimal pairs found in Australian English include 'Manning' (the surname)  and 'manning' (the present participle and gerund of the verb 'to man')  as well as 'planet'  versus 'plan it' .

Experimental recordings of RP-speaking Cambridge University undergraduates has indicated that after coarticulatory effects are taken into account, words such as bag, that, gab, Ann, ban, damp, mad, bad, and sad may have slightly longer  vowels than relatively shorter words such as lad, snag, pad, Pam, and plan. However, no evidence of consistent duration differentiation was found in the possible minimal pairs adder/adder, cad/CAD, can (noun)/can (verb), dam/damn, jam/jam, lam/lamb, manning/Manning, mass/mass, sad/SAD. This casts doubt on its status as a true phonemic split among RP-speakers, and has been described instead as diachronically stable, lexically specific sub-phonemic variation.

raising 

The most commonly tensed variant of  throughout North American English is when it appears before nasal consonants (thus, for example, in fan as opposed to fat).

In foreign borrowings 
Many foreign borrowed words such as taco, llama, drama, piranha, Bahamas, pasta, Bach, pecan, pajamas etc. vary as to whether or not they have the  vowel or the  vowel in various dialects in English. However the pronunciation of certain words can vary even in regions which either usually assign the  vowel or usually assign the  vowel to such words; pajamas and pecan, for instance, vary among Americans as to whether or not they have .

Other pronunciations 
Other pronunciations of the letter  in English have come about through:
Rounding caused by a following dark L (which may no longer be sounded), to produce (in RP) the sound  in also, alter, ball, call, chalk, halt, talk, etc.. See English-language vowel changes before historic /l/.
Rounding following , resulting in the same two vowels as above, as in wash, what, quantity, water, warm. This change is typically blocked before a velar consonant, as in wag, quack and twang, and is also absent in swam (the irregular past tense of swim). See Phonological history of English low back vowels (17th-century changes).
Reduction to schwa in most unstressed syllables, as in about, along, Hilary, comma, solar, standard, breakfast.
Irregular developments in a few words, particularly any and many. In the case of any, the spelling represents the pronunciation in the Midland dialect of Middle English, while the modern pronunciation comes from that of the southern dialect (the alternative spelling eny is also found in texts up to around 1530; the spelling ony, representing a northern dialect pronunciation, is also found). The situation is similar with many (with the spellings meny and mony formerly occurring).

See also
 List of Latin-script digraphs
 Phonological history of the English language
 Phonological history of English vowels

Notes

References
 
 
 
 
 Gupta, A. F., Baths and becks, English Today 81, Vol. 21, No. 1, pp21–27 (2005).
 Horvath, Barbara M. and Ronald J. Horvath. (2001). Short A in Australian English: A geolinguistic study. In English in Australia, ed. D. Blair and P. Collins, 341–55. Amsterdam: John Benjamins
 
 
  
 

For -tensing
Benua, L. 1995. Identity effects in morphological truncation. In Papers in optimality theory, ed. J. N. Beckman, L. Walsh Dickey, and S. Urbanczyk. UMass Occasional Papers 18. Amherst: GLSA, 77–136.
Ferguson, C. A. 1972. "Short a" in Philadelphia English. In Studies in linguistics in honor of George L. Trager, ed. M. E. Smith, 259–74. The Hague: Mouton.
Kahn, D. 1976. Syllable-based generalizations in English phonology. PhD dissertation, UCLA. Reproduced by the Indiana University Linguistics Club.
 Labov, W. 1966. The social stratification of English in New York City. Washington, D.C.: Center for Applied Linguistics.
Labov, W. 1972. Sociolinguistic patterns. Philadelphia: University of Pennsylvania Press.
Labov, W. 1981. Resolving the Neogrammarian controversy. Language 57:267–308.
Labov, W. 2005. Transmission and Diffusion.
 
Trager, G. L. 1930. The pronunciation of "short a" in American Standard English. American Speech 5:396–400.
Trager, G. L. 1934. What conditions limit variants of a phoneme? American Speech 9:313–15.
Trager, G. L. 1940. One phonemic entity becomes two: The case of "short a". American Speech 15:255–58.
Trager, G. L. 1941.  Maître Phonétique 17–19. 
Wood, Jim. 2011. Short-a in Northern New England. Journal of English Linguistics 39:135-165.

External links
 Sounds Familiar? – Listen to examples of regional accents and dialects on the British Library's 'Sounds Familiar' website, including an audio "bath" map of the UK

Splits and mergers in English phonology
Australian English
American English